Adriano Piraccini (born March 5, 1959) is an Italian professional football coach and a former player.

1959 births
Living people
Italian footballers
Serie A players
Serie B players
A.C. Cesena players
S.S.C. Bari players
Inter Milan players
Italian football managers
Alma Juventus Fano 1906 managers
Association football midfielders